Francisco de Reyna was a Spanish painter of the Baroque period. He was a native and active in Seville, where he trained with Francisco de Herrera the Elder. He painted a Souls in Purgatory in the church of All Saints, at Seville in 1659. He died young.

References

People from Seville
Painters from Seville
Spanish Baroque painters
17th-century Spanish painters
Spanish male painters